The James Ormond Wilson Normal School was a historic normal school in Washington, D.C.  Founded in 1873 as the Washington Normal School, it provided teacher training for the district's educators into the second half of the 20th century.  Its main building, located at 1100 Harvard Street NW, was designed by city architect Snowden Ashford and was completed in 1912.  It is a distinctive Jacobethan structure, built out of red brick with limestone trim elements.  The building now forms one of the campuses of the Carlos Rosario International Public Charter School.

The building was listed on the National Register of Historic Places in 2015.

See also
National Register of Historic Places listings in the upper NW Quadrant of Washington, D.C.

References

Columbia Heights, Washington, D.C.
School buildings completed in 1912
School buildings on the National Register of Historic Places in Washington, D.C.
1873 establishments in Washington, D.C.